The Gambia has the following National parks and nature reserves, managed by the Department of Parks and Wildlife Management:

See also
Farasuto Forest Community Nature Reserve, the Gambia

References

Gambia

National parks
National parks